Abdoulaye Diallo (born 1992) is a French-Senegalese footballer. The name may also refer to:

Abdoulaye Diallo (footballer, born 1963), Senegalese footballer
Abdoulaye Diallo (footballer, born October 1992), Senegalese footballer
Abdoulaye Diallo (footballer, born 1996), Senegalese footballer
Abdoulaye Diallo (judoka), Guinean judoka
Abdoulaye Samba Diallo, Senegalese athlete